Arotrophora is a genus of tortrix moth. They occur in Australia, where they are strongly associated with the plant family Proteaceae. All of the known Australian larvae bore in Banksia flower spikes. The genus was recently discovered from the Oriental region and one species is found on Papua.

Taxonomy
The genus was first published by amateur entomologist Edward Meyrick.

It is currently placed in subfamily Tortricinae (although most entomologists now consider this an unnatural group), and sometimes in the tribe Cnephasiini, although it is quite different from Northern Hemisphere genera placed in that tribe.

It is closely related to genera including Peraglyphis and Syllomatia; together, these genera are sometimes referred to as the Arotrophora group.

Species
The species of Arotrophora are:
 Arotrophora anemarcha (Lower, 1902)
 Arotrophora arcuatalis (Walker, 1865) (banksia boring moth)
 Arotrophora bernardmyo Razowski, 2009
 Arotrophora canthelias Meyrick, 1910
 Arotrophora charassapex Razowski, 2009
 Arotrophora charistis Meyrick, 1910
 Arotrophora charopa Razowski, 2009
 Arotrophora cherrapunji Razowski, 2009
 Arotrophora diadela Common, 1963
 Arotrophora ericirra Common, 1963
 Arotrophora euides Turner, 1927
 Arotrophora fijigena Razowski, 2009
 Arotrophora gilligani Razowski, 2009
 Arotrophora hongsona Razowski, 2009
 Arotrophora inthanona Razowski, 2009
 Arotrophora khasiasana Razowski, 2009
 Arotrophora khatana Razowski, 2009
 Arotrophora khunmaei Razowski, 2009
 Arotrophora kundasanga Razowski, 2009
 Arotrophora obrimsocia Razowski, 2009
 Arotrophora ochraceellus Walker, 1863 
 Arotrophora paiana Razowski, 2009
 Arotrophora siniocosma Turner, 1926
 Arotrophora tubulosa Razowski, 2009
 Arotrophora utarana Razowski, 2009

Former species
 Arotrophora crustata Meyrick, 1912
 Arotrophora semifulva (Meyrick, 1908)

References

External links
tortricidae.com

 
Tortricinae
Taxa named by Edward Meyrick
Tortricidae genera